The 18th Toronto Film Critics Association Awards, honoring the best in film for 2014, were awarded on December 15, 2014.

Winners

References

2014
2014 film awards
2014 in Toronto
2014 in Canadian cinema